Sandra Di Rocco (born 1967) is an Italian mathematician specializing in algebraic geometry. She works in Sweden as a professor of mathematics and dean of the faculty of engineering science at KTH Royal Institute of Technology, and chairs the Activity Group on Algebraic Geometry of the Society for Industrial and Applied Mathematics.

Education
Di Rocco earned a laurea from the University of L'Aquila in 1992, and completed her Ph.D. in mathematics in 1996 at University of Notre Dame in the US, supervised by Andrew J. Sommese.

Career
After postdoctoral research at the Mittag-Leffler Institute in Sweden and the Max Planck Institute for Mathematics in Germany, and short stints as an assistant professor at Yale University and the University of Minnesota, Di Rocco became an associate professor at KTH in 2003. She was named full professor in 2010, served as department chair from 2012 to 2019, and became dean in 2020.

Service
Di Rocco was elected as chair of the Activity Group on Algebraic Geometry (SIAG-AG) of the Society for Industrial and Applied Mathematics (SIAM) in 2020.

References

External links
Home page

1967 births
Living people
Italian mathematicians
Italian women mathematicians
Italian emigrants to Sweden
Swedish mathematicians
Swedish women mathematicians
Yale University faculty
University of Minnesota faculty
Academic staff of the KTH Royal Institute of Technology
Algebraic geometers
University of L'Aquila alumni